Inna Stryzhak (Ukrainian: Інна Стрижак), in some instances referred to as Inna Stryzhak-Dyachenko (née Dyachenko; born 11 June 1985) is a Paralympian athlete from Ukraine competing mainly in category T38 sprint events.

Stryzhak competed in her first Paralympics at the 2000 Games in Sydney, Australia. There she won a bronze medal in the women's 100 metres - T38 event and finished fourth in the women's 200 metres - T38 event. She was back in the Ukrainian team for the 2004 Summer Paralympics in Athens, Greece, adding a second bronze medal, this time in the women's 400 metres (T38). Stryzhak followed this with her most successful Games to date, winning two gold medals at the 2008 Summer Paralympics in Beijing, China. The first was in the women's 100 metres and the second in the women's 200 metres. Her fourth consecutive Games was London 2012 adding two more bronze medals in the 100m and 200m sprints and a silver in her new event, the long jump.

References

External links
 

Paralympic athletes of Ukraine
Athletes (track and field) at the 2000 Summer Paralympics
Athletes (track and field) at the 2004 Summer Paralympics
Athletes (track and field) at the 2008 Summer Paralympics
Paralympic gold medalists for Ukraine
Paralympic bronze medalists for Ukraine
1985 births
Living people
Medalists at the 2000 Summer Paralympics
Medalists at the 2004 Summer Paralympics
Medalists at the 2008 Summer Paralympics
Ukrainian female sprinters
Ukrainian female long jumpers
Sportspeople from Dnipro
Medalists at the 2012 Summer Paralympics
Paralympic medalists in athletics (track and field)